Israel attempted to participate in the Eurovision Song Contest 1996 in Oslo. Galit Bell represented Israel with the song "Shalom Olam". However, Israel was one of seven countries which failed to qualify for the Eurovision final from a pre-qualifying round, so they were not present in Norway.

Before Eurovision

Kdam Eurovision 1996 

The final took place on 29 February 1996 at the Neve Ilan TV Studios in Jerusalem, hosted by Ron Leventhal and Tal Man. Twelve entries competed and the winner, "Shalom olam" performed by Galit Bell, was selected by the votes of seven regional juries.

At Eurovision 
In 1996, for the only time in Eurovision history, an audio-only pre-qualifying round (from which hosts Norway were exempt) was held on 20 March as 29 countries wished to participate in the final but the European Broadcasting Union had set a limit of 22 (plus Norway). The countries occupying the bottom seven places after the pre-qualifier would be unable to take part in the main contest. After the voting, "Shalom Olam" had received 12 points, placing 28th and bringing Israel's participation in 1996 to a premature end.

Voting

References

1996
Countries in the Eurovision Song Contest 1996
Eurovision